The Diocese of Eswatini is a diocese in the Anglican Church of Southern Africa. It was founded in 1968. It comprises the country of Eswatini. It is divided in three archdeaconries, Eastern, Southern and Western.

History 
The diocese was created in 1968, shortly after the independence of Swaziland and had Anthony Hunter as its first bishop, from 1968 to 1975.

The diocese  is twinned with the Episcopal Diocese of Iowa (Iowa, United States) and with the Episcopal Diocese of Brechin (Scotland).

Bishops of the diocese
 Anthony Hunter, 1968–1975
 Bernard Lazarus Nyoni Mkhabela, 1975–1993
 Lawrence Bekisisa Zulu, 1993–2000
 Meshack Boy Mabuza, 2002–2012
 Ellinah Wamukoya, 2012–2021
 Dalcy Badeli Dlamini, 2022

Coat of arms 
The diocese registered a coat of arms at the Bureau of Heraldry in 1969 : Azure,  two  Swazi  battle-axes  erect addorsed, handles Or, blades Argent, bound Gules.  The shield is ensigned of a bishop's mitre.

References

External links 
 Official information from the Anglican Communion website
 Anglican Diocese of Swaziland at the Anglican Church of Southern Africa Official Website
 

Anglican Church of Southern Africa dioceses
Anglicanism in Eswatini
1968 establishments in Swaziland